Catherine Kirui (born 1 March 1976) is a retired Kenyan long-distance runner. She was a bronze medallist at the African Championships in Athletics in 2004.

International competitions

Personal bests
3000 metres - 9:12.05 min (1994)
5000 metres - 15:43.22 min (1995)
10,000 metres - 32:16.5 min (2004)
Half marathon - 1:10:38 min (2004)

External links
 

1976 births
Living people
Kenyan female long-distance runners
Kenyan female cross country runners